Pilva is a rural locality (a settlement) in Cherdynsky District, Perm Krai, Russia. The population was 383 as of 2010. There are 11 streets.

Geography 
Pilva is located 60 km north of Cherdyn (the district's administrative centre) by road. Kupchik is the nearest rural locality.

References 

Rural localities in Cherdynsky District